Ay, AY or variants, may refer to:

People
 Ay (pharaoh), a pharaoh of the 18th Egyptian dynasty
 Merneferre Ay, a pharaoh of the 13th Egyptian dynasty
 A.Y. (musician) (born 1981), a Tanzanian "bongo flava" artist
 A.Y, stage name of Ayo Makun, a Nigerian actor, comedian, radio and T.V presenter, actor, writer, director and MC.
 Fatma Ay (born 1992), Turkish female handball player
 Savaş Ay (1954–2013), Turkish journalist
 Yeliz Ay (born 1977), Turkish female racewalker

Places
 Aÿ, former commune of Marne départment, France
 Ay (river), a river in Russia
 Antarctica (DAFIF 0413 / DIA 65-18 / FIPS PUB 10-4 territory code and obsolete NATO digram AY)
 Armenia (WMO country code AY)

Language
 Aymara language (ISO-639 alpha-2 code AY)
 Ay, transliteration of Volapük Ä and ä

Other uses
 Academic year, sometimes abbreviated as "AY"
 General Instrument AY-3-8910, a computer sound chip common in the 1980s and often referred to as the "AY chip"
 Ay dynasty, a ruling lineage in south India
 "Ay", a song by Tarkan from the 2001 album Karma
 "Ay!", a song by Machine Gun Kelly from the 2022 album Mainstream Sellout
 AY, IATA airline designator for Finnair

See also
 Aye (disambiguation)
 Aylesbury, Buckinghamshire, England
 Eye (disambiguation)